The Regents were a Canadian group formed in 1959. They started out as a club band and then reformed as a recording band. They had a Top 20 hit with "Me and You".

Background
The formation of the group came about as a result of Steve Kennedy talking to Peter Groschel in the late 1950s. Kennedy was working for Bache and Co., where part of his job involved answering phone calls from Peter Groschel who worked in the stock brokerage business. Groshel would call Kennedy at Bache and Co. when there were international buy-and-sell orders. During the course of talking to each other over a period of time, and discovering Kennedy played saxophone A band was formed and Kennedy came in. The line up consisted of Brian Massey on bass, Tommy Goodings on guitar, Kennedy on saxophone and Groschel on drums. Some time later singer Kay Taylor came in to front the band. 

At some stage, they were invited by an man called Al Steiner for their group The Regents to be the house band for the Blue Note club. Drummer and founder developed health problems that lasted for six months. As a result he was replaced by drummer Bob Andrews. The group were a backing band and played with artists such as The Righteous Brothers, Jackie Wilson, Johnny Nash, Jimmy Reed, Conway Twitty, Stevie Wonder, along with local musicians such as Jackie Shane, Eric Mercury, Grant Smith, David Clayton Thomas, Ronnie Hawkins, Robbie Robertson and Levon Helm.

Around 1963, The Regents broke up and a short time later was reformed as a recording band with a different line up.  Kennedy hung around on the scene, and afterwards joined the replacement house band, The Silhouettes which was Doug Riley's band that included  Dianne Brooks in the line up. The new line up of The Regents recorded four singles and an album. One of them  “Me And You” became a Canadian Top 20 hit.

Career
After the early club house band line up of the Regents broke up, a new line up emerged. This consisted of Judi Jantzen and Duncan White on vocals, Bob Andrews on trumpet, Russ Strathdee on saxophone, Brian White on organ, Jack Arseneault on guitar, Wayne Harmon on drums and Bruce Staubitz on bass. They recorded four singles and an album.

It was noted by Billboard in the March 6, 1965 issue that their single "Me and You" bw "Playmates" had been picked up by Red Bird Records in the United States. The single was given a 4 star rating by Billboard in their March 27, 1965 issue.

By May 1, 1965, "Me and You" was charting. It was at #3 in the Billboard Hits of the World, Canadian Records division of the Canadian chart, just behind "Walk that Walk" by David Clayton Thomas & Quintet. The following week both singles had maintained their positions. For the week ending May 3rd, 1965, the song had moved up from #5 to #3 on the R.P.M.play sheet.
The single was released in the United States on the Blue Cat record label. Moving forward with the success of their single, Billboard noted it it's May 8, 1965 issue that Quality Records were releasing the album, Going Places with the Regents and that the hit single would be included. One of the first US radio stations to play the song was KYNO in Fresno. The station would later get an award from Quality records for breaking out "Shakin' All Over" by The Guess Who.

Also that year, the group had a full front page article and photo in the  May 3rd issue of RPM Weekly.

In 1966, they became a road band, performing as Dunc And Judi And The Regents.

Later years
Judi Jansen would become part of the group Tapestry with Jack Winters and Heather Woodburn.

Jansen aka Judith Harmon passed away on Friday, June 7, 2019 at age 76.

Discography Canada

Further reading
 RPM Weekly, Volume 3, No. 10 Week of May 3rd, 1965 The Regents
  Durhamregion.com, Tuesday, September 4, 2012 The three phases of The Regents
 Russ & Gary's "The Best Years of Music": Article feat. Kay Taylor and the Regents

References

External links
 ArtistInfo: The Regents
 Discogs: The Regents

Canadian pop music groups
Quality Records artists